is a Japanese ceramist. His real name is Hiroaki Morino.

Overviews 
He is a Japanese potter from Kyoto born in 1934. His father, Morino Kako (1879-1987), was also a potter. In the 1960s he taught pottery at the University of Chicago. His works have been displayed at the Herbert F. Johnson Museum of Art at Cornell University, in New York City, and in his native Japan.

Honours
Person of Cultural Merit (2021)

References

External links
HFJ museum at Cornell
Yakimoto.net

Japanese potters
Living people
1934 births
Persons of Cultural Merit